Sylvain Gaudreault (born July 8, 1970) is a Canadian politician and teacher. He was the Member of National Assembly of Quebec for the riding of Jonquière in the city of Saguenay from 2007 to 2022. He represents the Parti Québécois. On May 6, 2016, the party caucus chose him as interim leader following the resignation of PQ leader Pierre Karl Péladeau.

Life and career
Born in Chicoutimi, Quebec, Gaudreault went to the Université du Québec à Chicoutimi and obtained a bachelor's degree in history. He also received a bachelor's degree in law at Université Laval and was admitted to the Barreau du Québec in 1996. He is also currently doing a master's degree in regional intervention and studies. He worked since 2001 as a teacher at CEGEP de Jonquière and worked for the newspaper Le Quotidien.

Gaudreault was elected in Jonquière in the 2007 elections when he defeated Tourism Minister Françoise Gauthier. He had faced controversy during the campaign, when radio host Louis Champagne attacked both Gaudreault and Parti Québécois leader André Boisclair for being openly gay.

When the PQ formed government in 2012, Gaudreault entered Cabinet as Minister of Transport and Minister of Municipal Affairs, one of two LGBT ministers. While his stint in Cabinet only last 19 months due to the PQ's defeat in the subsequent election, he announced plans to extend the Montreal Metro's Blue Line to Anjou and the Yellow Line deeper into the Monteregie. As well, he became the point person on the government's plans to further electrify public transit across Quebec.

He ran for party leader in the 2020 Parti Québécois leadership election, placing second behind Paul St-Pierre Plamondon.

He was defeated in 2022 by CAQ candidate Yannick Gagnon.

References

External links
 
 PQ webpage 

1970 births
French Quebecers
Gay politicians
Canadian LGBT people in provincial and territorial legislatures
Living people
Members of the Executive Council of Quebec
Parti Québécois MNAs
Politicians from Saguenay, Quebec
Université Laval alumni
Université du Québec à Chicoutimi alumni
Leaders of the Parti Québécois
21st-century Canadian politicians
21st-century Canadian LGBT people
Canadian gay men